The Șapartoc is a left tributary of the river Târnava Mare in Romania. It flows into the Târnava Mare in Albești.

References

Rivers of Romania
Rivers of Mureș County